Saint Cainnear (Cainder, Cannera) was the name of an obscure Irish saint mentioned in the life of St. Moluag. She was a first cousin of St. Brendan of Clonfert who healed her of muteness when she was sixteen years old. Little else is known about her except that she later became a nun and the foundress of a nunnery at Cluain Claraid of unknown locality. 

Her feast day is 6 November and was instituted in 1921 by Pope Benedict XV.

She is not to be confused with the more famous St. Cainnear of Bantry and Scattery Island.

See also
Conaire

References

6th-century Irish people
6th-century Christian saints